Mathesis (minor planet designation: 454 Mathesis) is a main-belt asteroid that was discovered by German astronomer Friedrich Karl Arnold Schwassmann on March 28, 1900.  Its provisional name was 1900 FC.

Photometric observations of this asteroid at the Altimira Observatory in 2004 gave a light curve with a period of 8.37784 ± 0.00003 hours and a brightness variation of 0.32 in magnitude. This differs from periods of 7.075 hours reported in 1994 and 7.745 hours in 1998.

References

External links 
 
 

Background asteroids
Mathesis
Mathesis
CB-type asteroids (Tholen)
19000328